The Ferrari 158 was a Formula One racing car made by Ferrari in 1964 as a successor to the V6-powered Ferrari 156 F1.

Ferrari 158 

It was the first Ferrari Formula One car to use a monocoque chassis. John Surtees drove the Ferrari 158 to win his only Formula One Drivers' World Championship, in 1964.

Ferrari won the 1964 Formula One World Championship by competing in the last two races in cars painted not in the traditional Rosso corsa but in white and blue. These cars were entered by the factory-supported but unofficial NART team, rather than the Scuderia Ferrari factory team. This was done as a protest concerning arguments between Ferrari and the Automobile Club d'Italia regarding the homologation of a new mid-engined Ferrari race car.

Ferrari 1512 
Ferrari also built a flat-12 powered Formula One car using the same chassis as the 158, designated the Ferrari 1512 or Ferrari 512 F1. This engine developed  @ 12,000 rpm compared to the  @ 11,000 rpm of the 158's V8 engine. This power output made it one of the most powerful 1.5-litre Formula One engines, second to Honda's RA271 V12. A total of three 1512 chassis were produced, numbered 0007, 0008 and 0009.

The 1512, with its larger, more powerful engine, was designed to be competitive on the longest, fastest circuits of the Formula One season, such as Reims, Spa, and Monza. In this role it complemented the lighter, nimbler V8-powered 158 which was more competitive on small, twisty circuits. The 1512 made its racing debut at the 1964 US Grand Prix at Watkins Glen, and raced alongside the 158 during the remainder of 1964 and into 1965.

Gallery
Ferrari 158 chassis with the two different engines

Complete Formula One World Championship results

(key) (results in bold indicate pole position; results in italics indicate fastest lap)

References

External links

158
Formula One championship-winning cars